The following is a current list of the highest-ranking leaders in major Christian churches or denominations. The list is in descending order based on the number of congregants.

Catholic Church

Pope
The 266th bishop of Rome is Pope Francis, who was elected on the 13th of March  2013.  As bishop of Rome the pope is the patriarch of the Latin Church, the largest of the Catholic Church's 24 autonomous (sui iuris) churches. He is also head of the college of bishops which governs the universal church. The Papal primacy doctrine of Catholics states that this primacy extends in perpetuity to the Pope and throughout the Catholic Church.

Eastern Catholic Churches
The pope is the supreme leader of these churches, and also, the head of the universal college of bishops. Each autonomous (sui iuris) church has its own patriarch or other presiding bishop:

Coptic Catholic Church: Patriarch Ibrahim Isaac Sidrak
Melkite Greek-Catholic Church: Patriarch Youssef Absi
Maronite Church: Patriarch Bechara Boutros al-Rahi
Syriac Catholic Church: Patriarch Mar Ignatius Joseph III Yonan
Chaldean Catholic Church: Patriarch Louis Raphaël I Sako
Armenian Catholic Church: Patriarch Raphaël Bedros XXI Minassian
Ukrainian Greek-Catholic Church: Major Archbishop Sviatoslav Shevchuk
Syro-Malabar Church: Major Archbishop George Alencherry
Syro-Malankara Catholic Church: Major Archbishop Moran Mor Baselios Cleemis Catholicos
Romanian Greek-Catholic Church: Major Archbishop Lucian Mureșan
Ruthenian Greek Catholic Church: Metropolitan William C. Skurla
Hungarian Greek Catholic Church: Bishop Péter Fülöp Kocsis
Slovak Greek Catholic Church: Metropolitan Ján Babjak
Ethiopian Catholic Church: Archbishop Berhaneyesus Souraphiel
Eritrean Catholic Church: Archbishop Menghesteab Tesfamariam

Eastern Orthodox Churches

Patriarchate 
Ecumenical Patriarchate of Constantinople: Bartholomew I of Constantinople
Pope and Patriarch of Alexandria: Theodore II
Patriarch of Antioch: John X
Patriarch of Jerusalem: Theophilos III
Patriarch of Moscow and all Rus': Kirill
Archbishop of Peć and Serbian Patriarch: Porfirije
Patriarch of Romania: Daniel
Patriarch of All Bulgaria: Neophyte
Catholicos-Patriarch of All Georgia: Ilia II

Archbishopric 
Archbishop of Cyprus: George III
Archbishop of Athens and all Greece: Ieronymos II
Archbishop of Albania: Anastasios
Archbishop of Ohrid and Macedonia: Stefan

Metropolis 
Metropolitan of All Poland: Sawa
Metropolitan of the Czech Lands and Slovakia: Rastislav Gont

Churches in partial communion 
Metropolitan of All America and Canada: Tikhon Mollard (autocephaly not universally recognized)
Metropolitan of Kyiv and All Ukraine: Epiphanius I (autocephaly not universally recognized, canonical ordination not universally recognised)

Churches not in communion

Oriental Orthodox Churches
 Pope of the Coptic Orthodox Church of Alexandria: Tawadros II. He also holds the title Patriarch of All Africa on the Holy Apostolic See of Saint Mark the Evangelist and is the spiritual leader of more than 16 million Copts.
Syriac Orthodox Patriarch of Antioch and All the East: Ignatius Aphrem II Karim. He is also the Supreme head of the Jacobite Syrian Christian Church in India.
Catholicos of All Armenians: Karekin II
Catholicos of the East: Baselios Marthoma Mathews III
Patriarch-Catholicos of Axum: Abune Mathias 
Patriarch of Eritrea: Abune Qerlos, though the legitimacy of his assumption of office has been questioned due to his predecessor Abune Antonios being removed from office, which is largely seen as non-canonical, for criticizing the civil government.

Churches not in communion
Patriarch of the British Orthodox Church: Abba Seraphim El-Suriani
Metropolitan of the Malabar Independent Syrian Church: Cyril Mar Baselios I

Church of the East
Catholicos-Patriarch of the Assyrian Church of the East: Mar Awa III
Catholicos-Patriarch of the Ancient Church of the East: Gewargis III Younan

Old Catholic Church

 Old Catholic Archbishop of Utrecht: Bernd Wallet, the principal leader of the Union of Utrecht. As a primate of the Old Catholic Church in communion with the see of Utrecht, he is considered first among equals though he does not have jurisdictional authority.
Prime Bishop of the Polish National Catholic Church: Anthony Mikovsky, the principal leader of the Union of Scranton.

Anglican Communion
 Monarch of the United Kingdom: King Charles III is the supreme governor of the Church of England, which places him as the titular leader of Anglican Christians in England.

 Archbishop of Canterbury: Justin Welby is the principal leader of the Anglican Communion. In most contexts, however, the archbishop of Canterbury is considered just the spiritual leader of the Church of England. As primate of the Church of England and the bishop of the Diocese of Canterbury, he is the symbolic head of the worldwide Anglican Communion. Also known as First Among Equals, he leads through example and persuasion but has no legal jurisdiction outside England.

Other
Secretary General of the World Evangelical Alliance: Thomas Schirrmacher
Chairman of the World Assemblies of God Fellowship: David Mohan
President of the World Communion of Reformed Churches: Najla Kassab
President of the World Methodist Council: Bishop Paulo Lockmann
President of the Confessional Evangelical Lutheran Conference (CELC): Rev. Gaylin Schmeling
President of the Lutheran World Federation: Archbishop Musa Filibus. Although the president does not have any jurisdiction outside of his own regional church, as president of the LWF he oversees the meetings of the leaders of other regional churches.
Chairman of the Pentecostal World Fellowship: Dr. William Wilson
Chief Apostle of the New Apostolic Church: Jean-Luc Schneider
President of the General Conference of the Seventh-day Adventist Church: Elder Ted N. C. Wilson
President of the Baptist World Alliance: Paul Mzisa
President of the Church of Jesus Christ of Latter-day Saints: Russell M. Nelson
Presiding Bishop of the Church Of God In Christ Inc.: John Drew Sheard, Sr
Executive Minister of Iglesia ni Cristo: Eduardo V. Manalo
General of The Salvation Army: Brian Peddle
 Prophet-President of the Community of Christ: Stephen M. Veazey
Patriarch of the Czechoslovak Hussite Church: Tomáš Butta 
President of the Synod of the Reformed Church in the United States: Dr. Frank Walker
Patriarch of the Apostolic Catholic Church: Juan Almario
Overall Servant of the Members Church of God International: Daniel Razon
Mar Thoma Metropolitan of the Mar Thoma Syrian Church: Theodosius Mar Thoma

References

Christian leaders
Lists of Christian religious leaders